Sabalan TV is a regional state run TV station affiliated to IRIB. It covers mostly Ardabil Province of Iran.

Sister channels 
Sahand TV
West Azerbaijan TV
Eshragh TV

References

External links

Television stations in Iran
Mass media in Ardabil
Azerbaijani-language television stations
Persian-language television stations